Martin Schütz may refer to:
 Martin Schütz (musician)
 Martin Schütz (theoretical chemist)